Savaiq is a Waic language spoken in Kunlong Township, Shan State, Burma.

The exact number of Savaiq speakers is unknown, but may possibly be around 10,000. Savaiq speakers are distributed in Kunlong, Mong Maw, and Lashio townships in Shan State, Burma.

Names
Savaiq means 'swallow (bird)'. Other names for Savaiq include:
Ming Yum
Loi
Loi Meung Yum
Khala
Laca
Loi Lah
Leh Nu
La Leit

Dialects
Dialects are Man Gyat and Thein Tan.

See also
Meung Yum language

References

Further reading

   
 

Languages of Myanmar
Palaungic languages